Kapanga Airport  is an airport serving the town of Kapanga in Lualaba Province, Democratic Republic of the Congo.

See also

 Transport in the Democratic Republic of the Congo
 List of airports in the Democratic Republic of the Congo

References

External links
 OpenStreetMap - Kapanga
 OurAirports - Kapanga Airport
 Kapanga Airport
 HERE Maps - Kapanga Airport
 

Airports in Lualaba Province